The 2018 Galway Senior Hurling Championship was the 121st staging of the Galway Senior Hurling Championship since its establishment in 1887. 

The winners St. Thomas' were presented with the Tom Callanan Cup having beaten Liam Mellows in the final on 18 November.	

Liam Mellows were the reigning champions. Ballinderreen participated in the senior championship having been promoted from the intermediate competition in 2017.

Competition format

Twenty four reams compete in the initial group stages of the championship – the top ranked twelve teams compete in the Senior A Group and the second ranked twelve teams compete in the Senior B Group. Eight teams from the Senior A Group and four teams from the Senior B Group progress to the knockout stage. The competition format is explained further in each of the championship rounds in the sections below.

Group stage

Senior A
Senior A consists of 12 teams divided into two groups of 6. The top two teams from each group automatically qualify for the quarter finals. The third and fourth teams from each group play in the preliminary quarter finals. The bottom two teams from each group play-off with the losing team relegated to playing in the following year's Senior B Section.

Senior A - Group 1
{| class="wikitable" 
!width=20|
!  style="width:150px; text-align:left;"|Team
!width=20|
!width=20|
!width=20|
!width=20|
!width=30|
!width=40|
!width=20|
!width=20|
|- style="background:#98FB98;"
|1||align=left| St. Thomas' ||5||4||1||0||4-97||5-65||29||9
|- style="background:#98FB98;"
|2||align=left| Liam Mellows ||5||3||1||1||5-83||3-82||7||7
|- style="background:#ccf;"
|3||align=left| Tommy Larkin's ||5||1||4||0||4-73||5-78||2||6
|- style="background:#ccf;"
|4||align=left| Castlegar ||5||2||1||2||8-72||4-75||9||5
|-
|5||align=left| Craughwell ||5||1||0||4||7-68||6-83||-12||2
|-
|6||align=left| Kilnadeema-Leitrim ||5||0||1||4||3-73||7-96||-35||1
|}

Senior A - Group 2
{| class="wikitable" 
!width=20|
!  style="width:150px; text-align:left;"|Team
!width=20|
!width=20|
!width=20|
!width=20|
!width=30|
!width=35|
!width=20|
!width=20|
|- style="background:#98FB98;"
|1||align=left| Sarsfields ||5||3||1||1||3-74||6-68||-3||7
|- style="background:#98FB98;"
|2|| style="text-align:left;"| Loughrea ||5||3||0||2||5-76||4-76||3||6
|- style="background:#ccf;"
|3|| style="text-align:left;"| Gort ||5||3||0||2||3-95||3-79||16||6
|- style="background:#ccf;"
|4|| style="text-align:left;"| Cappataggle ||5||2||1||2||2-83||4-73||4||5
|-
|5|| style="text-align:left;"| Mullagh||5||2||0||3||5-71||2-90||-10||4
|-
|6|| style="text-align:left;"| Portumna ||5||1||0||4||3-78||2-91||-10||2 
|}

Senior A - Relegation

Senior B
Senior B consists of 12 teams divided into two groups of 6. The winners of each group qualify for the 2018 preliminary quarter finals and compete in the following year's Senior A competition. The four second and third placed teams play-off with the two winners also qualifying for the 2018 preliminary quarter finals.

Senior B - Group 1

{| class="wikitable" 
!width=20|
!  style="width:150px; text-align:left;"|Team
!width=20|
!width=20|
!width=20|
!width=20|
!width=40|
!width=45|
!width=20|
!width=20|
|- style="background:#98FB98;"
|1|| style="text-align:left;"| Turloughmore ||5||5||0||0||4-93||5-61||29||10
|- style="background:#ccf;"
|2|| style="text-align:left;"| Clarinbridge ||5||4||0||1||7-82||2-81||19||8
|- style="background:#ccf;"
|3|| style="text-align:left;"| Killimordaly ||5||2||1||2||5-82||4-75||10||5
|-
|4|| style="text-align:left;"| Ballinderreen ||5||2||0||3||8-59||4-76||-5||4
|-
|5|| style="text-align:left;"| Ahascragh-Fohenagh ||5||1||0||4||5-63||8-84||-30||2
|-
|6|| style="text-align:left;"| Beagh ||5||0||1||4||6-81||12-83||-23||1
|}

Senior B - Group 2

{| class="wikitable" 
!width=20|
!  style="width:150px; text-align:left;"|Team
!width=20|
!width=20|
!width=20|
!width=20|
!width=30|
!width=40|
!width=20|
!width=20|
|- style="background:#98FB98;"
|1||align=left| Tynagh-Abbey/Duniry ||5||4||1||0||6-89||4-63||32||9
|- style="background:#ccf;"
|2||align=left| Athenry ||5||3||0||2||6-71||2-69||14||6
|- style="background:#ccf;"
|3||align=left| Padraig Pearse's ||5||3||0||2||4-74||1-65||18||6
|-
|4||align=left| Abbeyknockmoy ||5||1||2||2||6-79||8-77||-14||4
|-
|5||align=left| Ardrahan ||5||1||1||3||3-69||2-82||-10||3
|-
|6||align=left| Moycullen ||5||0||2||3||4-67||12-83||-40||2

|}

Senior B - playoffs

The second team in Senior B Group 1 plays the third team in Senior B Group 2 and the third team in Senior B Group 1 plays the second team in Senior B Group 2. The two winning teams qualify for the 2018 senior preliminary quarter finals. The two losing teams are eliminated from this year's senior championship.

Senior B - Relegation

The losing team is relegated to the following year's intermediate championship.

Senior Knockout stage

Senior Preliminary Quarter-finals

The four teams who finished third and fourth in the two Senior A Groups play the four Senior B teams who qualified (the two winners of the two Senior B Groups plus the two winners of the Senior B play-offs).

Senior Quarter-finals

The four teams who finished first and second in the two Senior A groups play the four winners of the senior preliminary quarter finals.

Senior Semi-finals

Senior final

References

Galway Senior Hurling Championship
Galway Senior Hurling Championship